The Shaykh Bahai hammam is a historical hammam in Isfahan, Iran. The hammam belongs to the Safavid era and is located in the Shaykh Bahai alley in the Abd or-Razagh street. It is the most famous hammam in Isfahan. It was built in 1616 by Shaykh Bahai in the era of Abbas I and is located between Jameh mosque of Isfahan and Harounieh in the old Bazaar near the famous Darb-e Imam. Because of its unique features, there are many tales and stories about it.

Fuel of Garmkhaneh (hothouse) 
The people of Isfahan believed since the old times, that Shaykh Bahai built the stove of this hammam, so that it can be warmed by only one candle and under the cauldron of the stove, he made an empty closed space and lit a candle in it and the candle was lit for a very long time and the water of the hammam became warm by it. There are different theories about the fuel of the Garmkhaneh, which can not be proved because there is no candle and no complete research has been done yet.

The most realistic theory about the fuel of the Garmkhaneh is that there was an underground ceramic piping system between the public toilet of the Jameh mosque and the hammam and probably gases like methane and sulfur oxides led to the torch of heated pool by the natural suction method and methane and sulfur oxides burned directly as the heating source in torch, or these gases were used from the wastes of hammam. According to old residents in the neighborhood, there was an artificial marsh behind the Garmkhaneh and wastewater flew in the marsh and needed gas was obtained from this marsh.

The Shaykh Bahai hammam had two dressing rooms. The bigger dressing room was for men and the smaller one for women. The hammam had also a swimming pool, heated pools and an ab anbar.

The swimming pool section is used at present as a cotton spinning factory by private sector. Until 20 years ago, Shaykh Bahai hammam was used as a hammam. Then it was closed and after 10 years it came in the possession of the Cultural Heritage, Handcrafts and Tourism Organization. Since 2007, the Garmkhaneh of the hammam has been being repaired by this organization.

See also
List of the historical structures in the Isfahan province

References

2. https://theiranproject.com/blog/2015/06/08/a-burning-candle-a-hot-bath-connect-the-dots/

Buildings and structures in Isfahan
Tourist attractions in Isfahan Province
Public baths in Iran